Ivan Lendl was the defending champion and successfully defended his title, defeating Todd Martin in the final, 6–4, 6–4.

Seeds

Draw

Finals

Top half

Section 1

Section 2

Bottom half

Section 3

Section 4

References

 Main Draw

1993 ATP Tour
Tokyo Indoor